The Woman with Orchids (German: Die Frau mit den Orchideen) is a 1919 German silent film directed by Otto Rippert and starring Carl de Vogt, Werner Krauss and Gilda Langer.

Cast
 Carl de Vogt
 Werner Krauss
 Gilda Langer

References

Bibliography
 Hardt, Ursula. From Caligari to California: Erich Pommer's Life in the International Film Wars. Berghahn Books, 1996.
 McGilligan, Patrick. Fritz Lang: The Nature of the Beast. University of Minnesota Press, 2013.

External links

1919 films
Films of the Weimar Republic
German silent feature films
Films directed by Otto Rippert
German black-and-white films
1910s German films